Belra is a village which is located in Roorkee tehsil of Haridwar district in Uttarakhand, India. It is spread over a flat terrain with the grand spectacle of the Himalayas ranges flanking it in the East and the North east. Roorkee is the nearest town to Belra(Belda) village. 
Belra(belda) is situated on National Highway 8. It is 10 km from Roorkee and 25 km from Haridwar.

Village panchayat Belda 
Village panchayat Belda is situated in nyay panchayat Belda in block panchayat Roorkee. The distance of the village panchayat is 10 km far metaled road from block headquarters. The village pradhan of Belda is Mr. sachin kumar.

Climate 
Due to its location away from any major body and its proximity to the Himalayas, Belra(Belda) has an extreme and erratic continental climate. Summers starts in late March and go on until early July, with average temperature around 28 °C. The monsoon season starts in July and goes on until October, with torrential rainfall, due to the blocking of the monsoon clouds by the Himalayas. The post monsoon season starts in October and goes on until late November, with average temperature sliding from 21 °C (70 °F) to 15 °C (59 °F). Winters start in December, with lows close to freezing and frequent cold waves due to the cold Katabatic winds blowing from the Himalayas. The total annual rainfall is about 2600 mm(102 in).

Demographics 
The population as of 2011 in the village panchayat is 4800 (male 2500 and female 2300). Hindi is a local language here.

 Ror (ROD)
 yadav 
 Muslim 
 Brahmin 
 chamar
 Jogi
 Thakur
 kashyap

Economy 
The main source of income is agriculture. Farmers of Belda and surrounding areas produces wheat, rice, sugarcane and vegetables, which supply local mills and markets.

Transport

By rail
Roorkee Railway Station is the very nearest railway station to Belra.

Education

Schools 
 Government primary school 1 & 2
 Lord Shiva academy

Places of interest

Bank 
Punjab national bank 
IFSC Code: PUNB0203100 (5th character is zero)
Branch code: 203100
Contact: 01332-277328

Others 
There is blank place in the entrance of the village, people called it basak.

Villages in Haridwar district